HMAS Ovens (S 70) is an Oberon-class submarine, formerly of the Royal Australian Navy (RAN). She was one of six Oberons built for the Royal Australian Navy by the Scottish Scotts Shipbuilding and Engineering Company, and entered service in 1969. The vessel was named for Irishman and Australian explorer John Ovens (1788–1825) and for whom the Victorian river Ovens was named. During her career, Ovens was the first RAN submarine to deploy with the ANZUK force, and the first RAN submarine to fire an armed Mark 48 torpedo, sinking the target ship . The boat was decommissioned in 1995, and is preserved at the Western Australian Maritime Museum as a museum ship.

Design and construction

The Oberon class was based heavily on the preceding Porpoise class of submarines, with changes made to improve the vessels' hull integrity, sensor systems, and stealth capabilities. Eight submarines were ordered for the RAN, in two batches of four. The first batch (including Ovens) was approved in 1963, and the second batch was approved during the late 1960s, although two of these were cancelled before construction started in 1969, with the funding redirected to the Fleet Air Arm. This was the fourth time the RAN had attempted to establish a submarine branch.

At full load displacement, she displaced 2,030 tons when surfaced, and 2,410 tons when submerged. The two propeller shafts were each driven by an English Electric motor providing 3,500 brake horsepower and 4,500 shaft horsepower; the electricity for these was generated by two Admiralty Standard Range supercharged V16 diesel generators. When launched, the boat had a company of 8 officers and 56 sailors, but by the time she decommissioned, the number of sailors had increased to 60. In addition, up to 16 trainees could be carried.

The main armament of the Oberons consisted of six  torpedo tubes. The British Mark 8 torpedo was initially carried by the submarine; this was later replaced by the wire-guided Mark 23. Between March 1980 and August 1982, the Australian Oberons were upgraded to carry United States Navy Mark 48 torpedoes and UGM-84 Sub Harpoon anti-ship missiles. As of 1996, the standard payload of an Australian Oberon was a mix of 20 Mark 48 Mod 4 torpedoes and Sub Harpoon missiles. Some or all of the torpedo payload could be replaced by Mark 5 Stonefish sea mines, which were deployed through the torpedo tubes. On entering service, two stern-mounted, short-length  torpedo tubes for Mark 20 anti-submarine torpedoes. However, the development of steerable wire-guided torpedoes made the less-capable aft-firing torpedoes redundant; they were closed off, and later removed during a refit.

Ovens was laid down by Scotts Shipbuilding and Engineering Company at Greenock, Scotland on 17 June 1966, launched on 4 December 1967, and commissioned into the RAN on 18 April 1969.

Operational history
In 1970, Ovens visited ports in New Zealand. The submarine visited New Zealand again during late August and early September 1971, and was used to train Royal New Zealand Navy vessels in anti-submarine warfare.

In January 1972, Ovens was deployed to South East Asia to serve with the ANZUK force: the first RAN submarine to do so. During the deployment, which lasted until June, the boat participated in SEATO Exercise Sea Hawk.

In May 1976, the submarine was sent to the Far East on a five-and-a-half-month deployment. Before returning to home port, Ovens participated in the Kangaroo 2 multinational exercise, which simulated an attack on a coastal area. Assigned to the Orange (defending) force, Ovens was able to claim successful 'attacks' on 170,000 tonnes of shipping, including the aircraft carrier . Returning to  after the exercise, the submarine sailed into Sydney Harbour claiming a "clean sweep" by lashing a broom to the attack periscope.

Ovens became the first RAN submarine to fire an armed Mark 48 torpedo, when she sank the decommissioned   on 4 March 1987. On her return to port, Ovens flew a 'Jolly Roger' to indicate a successful mission: the first time a RAN submarine had done so.

The submarine made a port visit to Geelong, Victoria in June 1995.

Decommissioning and fate

Ovens paid off on 1 December 1995. The submarine was gifted to the Western Australian Museum in November 1998. She is preserved as a museum ship at the Western Australian Maritime Museum in Fremantle, Western Australia.

Citations

References

External links

 RAN webpage for HMAS Ovens
 HNSA Ship Page: HMAS Ovens

Oberon-class submarines of the Royal Australian Navy
Ships built on the River Clyde
1967 ships
Museum ships in Australia
Museums in Western Australia
Ships built by Scotts Shipbuilding and Engineering Company